Hieronyma macrocarpa is a species of plant in the family Phyllanthaceae, which was recently separated from the Euphorbiaceae. It is found in Colombia and Ecuador.

References

macrocarpa
Vulnerable plants
Taxonomy articles created by Polbot
Taxobox binomials not recognized by IUCN